Aryambika S. V. (born 1981) is a Malayalam language poet from Kerala, India. She received several awards including Yuva Puraskar by Sahithya Akademi and Kanakasree Award by Kerala Sahitya Akademi.

Biography
Aryambika was born on 1981 at Edanadu, Pala, Kottayam district, Kerala to K. N. Viswanathan Nair and M. K. Savithriamma. Her mother Savitriamma was a Sanskrit teacher. Her father Viswanathan Nair, who was a teacher and exponet in Aksharaslokam, discovered her ability to write and encouraged her to write poetry. After completing primary education from Edanad Govt. L. P. School and Edanad Shakthivilasam N.S.S. High School, she done her graduation from Sree Sankaracharya University of Sanskrit (Thiruvananthapuram Regional Center & Kalady). Aryambika worked as a teacher at Poovarani Govt LP School near Pala. She currently works as Assistant Professor of Sanskrit at Sanskrit department, Mahathma Gandhi College, Thiruvananthapuram.

Personal life
Aryambika and her husband Sreedas, a native of Panangad and an IT auditor have one son.

Literary career
Aryambika has excelled in Aksharaslokam and poetry since childhood. She also writes songs, and also wrote the lyrics for the musical documentary Amma Abhayam directed by Babu Gopalakrishnan. The opening song for the 2016 Kerala School Kalolsavam was written by Aryambika. She had also wrote the song for the Kerala government's Sutharya Keralam program. She is also active in a shloka organization named Pala Kairaleeshlokarangam.

Works
 Poetry collection.
 Poetry collection.
 Poetry collection.
 Poetry collection.
 Anthology

Awards and honors
Yuva Puraskar 2015 by Sahithya Akademi
Kanakasree Award 2012 by Kerala Sahitya Akademi

Edasseri Award for Poetry 2018
Second place in Kavyakeli (poetry) in Kerala School Kalolsavam held in Kottayam in 1996

References 

1981 births
Living people
Malayali people
People from Kottayam district
Poets from Kerala
Women writers from Kerala
Malayalam poets
Indian women poets
21st-century Indian poets
21st-century Indian women writers
21st-century Indian writers
People from Pala, Kerala
Recipients of the Sahitya Akademi Yuva Puraskar